Sand Lake Wetland Management District is located in the U.S. state of South Dakota and is administered by the U.S. Fish and Wildlife Service. This is the largest Wetland Management District in the U.S., with 45,000 acres (182 km2) of area directly under federal protection and another 550,000 acres (2,225 km2) managed in partnership with private landowners as conservation easements. A total of 162 Waterfowl Production areas are located on the federally owned lands and the conservation easements are generally adjacent to these areas and act as buffer zones to increase habitat protection.

References

External links
 

National Wildlife Refuges in South Dakota
Protected areas established in 1961
Wetlands of South Dakota
Bodies of water of Brown County, South Dakota
Protected areas of Brown County, South Dakota
1961 establishments in South Dakota